Bathurst Regional Council is a local government area in the Central West region of New South Wales, Australia. The area is located adjacent to the Great Western Highway, Mid-Western Highway, Mitchell Highway and the Main Western railway line.

The mayor of Bathurst is Cr. Robert Taylor, Deputy Mayor being Cr. Benjamin Fry, both unaligned politicians.

City, towns and localities
In addition to the city of Bathurst, the LGA contains the villages of Eglinton, Freemantle, Perthville, Rockley, Raglan, Georges Plains, Trunkey Creek, Brewongle, Vittoria, Peel, Wattle Flat, Sofala, Hill End, Meadow Flat, Sallys Flat and Caloola.

Demographics

Council

Current composition and election method
Bathurst Regional Council is composed of nine councillors elected proportionally as a single ward. All councillors are elected for a fixed three-year term of office. The mayor is elected by the councillors at the first meeting of the council. The most recent election of councillors was held on 4 December 2021, and the makeup of the council is as follows:

The current Council, elected in 2021, in order of election, is:

History

Bathurst was proclaimed a city in 1885. The Bathurst Region was created on 26 May 2004 as a result of a merger of Bathurst City and Evans Shire.

The outcome of an independent review was expected to be completed by mid–2016. Bathurst Regional Council was officially notified on 6 March 2017 by the NSW State Government that the proposed merger between Bathurst Regional Council and Oberon Council will not proceed. The letter from the Minister for Local Government Gabrielle Upton advising Council of the decision can be viewed on the Bathurst Regional Council official website.

Sister cities

Bathurst has had a sister city relationship with Ohkuma (Japan) since March 1991.The relationship provides an opportunity for both Bathurst and Ohkuma residents to learn about each other's culture and language. As part of the relationship Council coordinates the Sister City Working Party.  This group is made up of different community members who have an interest in Japan and further developing the strong relationship that already exists between Bathurst and Ohkuma. Bathurst has sister city relations with the following city:

 Ōkuma, Japan, since 1991

References

External links

 
Local government areas of New South Wales
Bathurst, New South Wales
2004 establishments in Australia
Populated places established in 2004